Virgil Clark Smith (born July 4, 1947) is a judge of the 3rd Circuit Court in Wayne County, Michigan. He was appointed to fill a vacancy in this court by Michigan Governor Jennifer Granholm. Smith has served as a member of the Michigan House of Representatives and as a Michigan state senator. He represented a district in Detroit.

Smith earned his bachelor's degree from Michigan State University and has a Juris Doctor degree from Wayne State University.

Smith had served on the judiciary committee of the state house in 1980–1981. He was elected to the Michigan State Senate in 1988, and became the Democratic floor leader in 1995. Smith was the first African-American Michigan Senate floor leader. In 1992 Smith made an unsuccessful run for the office of Wayne County Prosecutor. Since the state senators serve for four years, Smith was not up for re-election in that year. He was first elected to the state senate in a special election. He resigned to take a job with the Wayne County Prosecutors office in 2001 and remained in that job until he was appointed to the Circuit Court in 2004.

On January 1, 2009 Smith became the chief judge of the 3rd Circuit.

Smith and his wife Elizabeth are the parents of four children. Among these are Virgil Smith, Jr., a member of the Michigan Senate, who, whilst serving as a state senator, was sent to jail in 2016.

He has four children, Adam, Virgil, Anthony, and Jordan.

His wife, Elizabeth, is the daughter of the youngest of Malcolm X's brothers, Robert Little.

References

Sources 
 Announcement of Smith's appointment to court
 Michigan Citizen article on Smith

Politicians from Detroit
Democratic Party Michigan state senators
Democratic Party members of the Michigan House of Representatives
Michigan State University alumni
Wayne State University alumni
Living people
Michigan state court judges
African-American state legislators in Michigan
African-American judges
1947 births
20th-century American politicians
21st-century American politicians
20th-century African-American politicians
21st-century African-American politicians
21st-century American judges